Boí Taüll Resort is a ski resort located in the heart of the Pyrenees, in the Vall de Boí, Catalonia (Spain), opened in 1988.

The ski resort comprises only the small Mulleres Valley, although future expansion is planned for the Valley Manyanet. The service centres and parking are placed in the Pla de les Vaques (2,020 m). From there leave 4 chairlifts, 1 platter lift, and 3 carpets. From the top, in the Puig Falcó (2,751 m), you can see impressive views of Pallars Jussà and Pic of the Orri in the neighbouring ski resort of Port Ainé.
Is the highest point of the resort, and all ski resorts in the Catalan Pyrenees, and borders the peripheral zone of Aigüestortes i Estany de Sant Maurici National Park.

References

External links
Official website

Ski areas and resorts in Catalonia
Alta Ribagorça
Vall de Boí